Hallelujah Junction is a two-CD retrospective album of works by John Adams on the Nonesuch label, published as a companion to his memoir Hallelujah Junction: Composing an American Life. It is also available in mp3 format.

Track listing
CD 1
 Harmonielehre: Part I	17:03
 Shaker Loops: I. Shaking and Trembling	8:25
 Harmonium: III. Wild Nights	11:38
 Nixon in China: Act I, Scene 3 ("Ladies and Gentlemen")	6:36
 Nixon in China: Act I, Scene 3 ("Mr. Premier")	2:37
 Nixon in China: Act I, Scene 3 (Cheers)	3:48
 Chamber Symphony: Mongrel Airs	7:50
 Gnarly Buttons: III. Put Your Loving Arms Around Me	8:32
 Hoodoo Zephyr	10:18
CD 2
 The Death of Klinghoffer: Palestinian Chorus	8:37
 The Death of Klinghoffer: Exiled Jews Chorus	8:37
 I Was Looking at the Ceiling and Then I Saw the Sky: Este Pais	4:26
 Violin Concerto: III.	7:44
 Naive and Sentimental Music: III. Chain to the Rhythm	10:59
 El Niño: The Babe Leaped in Her Womb	3:30
 El Niño: Magnificat	3:23
 A Flowering Tree: Act II, Scene 4: Kumudha and the Beggar Minstrels (excerpt)	7:08
 The Dharma at Big Sur: Part 1	14:33

References

Classical albums by American artists